Muk is a Korean food made from grains, beans, or nut starch such as buckwheat, sesame, and acorns and has a jelly-like consistency. Muk has little flavor on its own, so muk dishes are seasoned with soy sauce, sesame oil, chopped scallions, crumbled gim, and chili pepper powder, and mixed with various vegetables.

Types
There are several types of muk:
Dotori-muk (도토리묵), made from acorn starch
Memil-muk (메밀묵), made from buckwheat starch
Nokdu-muk (녹두묵), made from mung bean starch
Hwangpo-muk (황포묵),(also called norang-muk), made from mung bean starch, and colored yellow with gardenia coloring
Kkae-muk (깨묵), made from sesame seeds
Varieties of green pea muk, cheongpo muk (청포묵) and hwangpo muk (황포묵).

Muk dishes

Muk-muchim (묵무침), muk dish seasoned with ganjang (Korean soy sauce), sesame or perilla oil, finely chopped green onions, sesame seeds, and red chili pepper powder. It can be mixed with sliced or shredded cucumber, and leaf vegetables, such as chopped lettuce, cabbage or napa cabbage. The dish can also be served with only crumbled gim (Korean nori) added as a garnish.
Tangpyeong-chae (탕평채), made with thinly sliced nokdumuk, beef, vegetables, and seaweed.
Muk-bokkeum (묵볶음), a stir-fried muk dish.
Muk-jangajji (묵장아찌), marinated muk in ganjang
Muk-jeonyueo (묵전유어) or mukjeon (묵전), made by pan-frying sliced muk that has been coated with mung bean starch.
Muk-sabal (묵사발) or also called mukbap (묵밥), cold soup made with muk and sliced vegetables.

See also

Burmese tofu
Jelly
Jidou liangfen
Konjac
Laping
Liangfen
Liang pi
Tangpyeongchae

References

External links
Muk recipe at Korea Times